Lutetium–yttrium oxyorthosilicate, also known as LYSO, is an inorganic chemical compound with main use as a scintillator crystal for gamma radiation detection. Its chemical formula is Lu2(1-x)Y2xSiO5. The percentage of yttrium varies considerably, with values in the literature ranging from 5% to 70%. It is commonly used to build screens and electromagnetic calorimeters in particle physics. LYSO crystals have the advantages of high light output and density, quick decay time, excellent energy resolution. The crystals are often grown in boules using the Czochralski process, and cutting or polishing can be challenging because LYSO is brittle and hard.

References

Phosphors and scintillators
Crystals
Silicates
Lutetium compounds
Yttrium compounds